Disney Learning: Winnie the Pooh comprises three titles: Winnie The Pooh Toddler, Winnie the Pooh Preschool and Winnie The Pooh Kindergarten. They are point-and-click educational video games developed and published by Disney Interactive and based on the Winnie the Pooh franchise. The titles were shipped by BAM! Entertainment.

Gameplay 
The games were designed to emulate the plots of the television series and movies, while adding an adventure game interface that allowed players to complete educational activities to advance the story. Some games intended to teach kids about languages other than English. For instance, Owl's Magnificent Machine in Toddler taught players the Spanish and French equivalent of the objects they identified. BusinessWire reported that "parents who register their purchased titles can unlock add-on packs from Disney Interactive", which included additional activities. Printable activities included coloring book pages, cutouts, name tags, bookmarks and flashcards.

Promotion 
The games were included in the mobile showroom Disney Big Rig, which toured Southern and Northern California Wal-Mart stores in September and October 2000, along with Disney's Mickey Mouse Toddler, Disney's Mickey Mouse Preschool, Disney's Mickey Mouse Kindergarten, Disney/Pixar's Buzz Lightyear 1st Grade, Disney/Pixar's Buzz Lightyear 2nd Grade. Disney's Winnie the Pooh Kindergarten was included in Disney Interactive Channel. Toddler was included in the Disney Learning Toddler set, along with the Mickey Mouse Toddler game.

Critical reception 
PC Mag praised the series for its "cinematic animation", "creative story lines", "characters that exude personality", and a "fun-filled curriculum". The Washington Times said that the three titles taught "age-appropriate skills that emphasize creativity, discovery, working together and active participation".

Toddler 
Edutaining Kids thought the game's graphics were "rich", and that it would add variety to a toddler's video game collection. In a preview, Kid's Domain gave the game an 8/10. The Boston Herald thought the game was good, though noted there was other, better toddler edutainment. New Straits Times' favourite part of the game was a karaoke-style activity. Jinny Gudmundsen of Choosing Children's Software thought the game was part of an era of "lapware", in which there was a focus on cause and effect; when the player moves the mouse or uses the keyboard they get an immediate response.

Preschool 
DiscoverySchool gave Preschool Plus a 9 out of 10, noting that the engaging story adds to its replayability. SuperKids said the title wasn't "innovative", though recommended it as a solid educational game featuring a popular cast of characters. Ouders Online thought the game was entertaining, but not original. Allgame gave the title a rating of 4.5 stars out of 5, commenting that the graphics matched those of the TV series and movies.

Kindergarten 
Superkids deemed the game "fast-paced", light-hearted", "easy to use", and "sure to please". The Cincinnati Post thought the game was "cute", but ultimately unable to capture the attention of young players for long stretches of time.

See also
 Disney Learning: Mickey Mouse

References 

Disney Interactive
Children's educational video games
Winnie-the-Pooh
Winnie-the-Pooh video games